Sylvania Waters was an Australian reality television series that followed the lives of an Australian family – one of the first such programs in Australia. It premiered on Australian television in 1992 and was co-produced by the Australian Broadcasting Corporation (ABC) and the British Broadcasting Corporation (BBC). The show documented the lives of Noeline Baker and Laurie Donaher of 48 Macintyre Crescent in the Sydney waterside suburb of Sylvania Waters over a six-month period, emphasising the couple's newfound wealth and luxurious lifestyle as well as interpersonal conflicts.

References

External links
Encyclopedia of Television
Sylvania Waters at the National Film and Sound Archive

1992 Australian television series debuts
1992 Australian television series endings
1990s Australian reality television series
Australian Broadcasting Corporation original programming
Television shows set in Sydney